The Superkavitierender Unterwasserlaufkörper (lit. Supercavitating Underwater Running Body, formerly known as Barracuda) was a German close-range supercavitating torpedo technology demonstrator designed by the Diehl BGT Defense and developed in cooperation with the German Navy. The supercavitating torpedo for a "close-range defense of underwater targets" was presented to the public in 2005 as a prototype, but it never went into development and procurement.

This form of torpedo solves the problem of high underwater drag by means of the supercavitation effect, where underwater at a velocity of around 180 km/h a cavity filled with steam surrounds the moving object. Only the tip is in contact with the water, as such the frictional resistance is greatly reduced. The propulsion of such a torpedo can no longer be done by a propeller but requires a rocket engine.

To steer, this torpedo has a pivoting head segment. If the torpedo rises or falls, the water pressure acting on it also changes, and the cavitation bubble changes. When sinking, the water pressure increases and the bubble is compressed; when the torpedo rises, the pressure drops and the bubble gets bigger. In order to keep the bubble intact with increasing water pressure, additional gas is pumped into the bladder.

According to the manufacturer, the torpedo reaches a speed of over 400 km/h underwater and is steerable. It is not dependent on the launch from submarines but can dive into the water from the air and continue its supercavitation trip from there.

See also 
  VA-111 Shkval — comparable Soviet torpedo from 1977.
  Hoot — Iranian model reverse-engineered from the Soviet Shkval.

References 

Torpedoes of Germany
Supercavitating torpedoes